Mohammadi Group is a Bangladeshi diversified conglomerate based in Dhaka with a focus on the garments industry. It was founded by Anisul Huq. Rubana Huq is the managing director of Mohammadi Group. Navidul Haq is a director of the Mohammadi Group.

History 
Mohammadi Group was established in 1986 by Anisul Huq. It started with a single factory that had 500 workers. Before that Haq was working as the managinf director of the Mohammadi Group of Companies Limited. The other founders of the group were Faruk-Al-Nasir and Habib Rahman.

Anisul Huq, Chairman of Mohammadi Group, contested the Bangladesh Garment Manufacturers and Exporters Association president election in 1998.

In 1999, Mohammadi Group established TechnoVista Limited. In 2000, Anisul Huq said that the garments industry was losing 2 billion taka a day due to strike (hartal) in Chittagong.

The Mohammadi Limited (Sample) was established as a sample making factory for the group in 2002. It also established Mohammadi Fashion Sweaters Limited in Khilkhet Kha para.

Mohammadi Group established a garment factory called Mohammadi Group Limited in 2003. Its clients include Costco, ECI New York, H&M, Haggar Clothing, Perry Ellis, Primark, Sears, Springfield, and Walmart. The Government of Denmark provided 26.5 million taka to Technovista Limited through the Danida Private Sector Development Programme. The ambassador of Denmark to Bangladesh, Niels Severin Munk, and chairman of Mohammadi Group Anisul Haq.

The Group established Desh Energy Limited in 2005. It owns Desh Cambridge Kumargaon Power Company Limited which operates a 10 megawatt powerplant at Kumargaon. It also owns Desh Energy Chandpur Power Company Limited which operates a 200 megawatt powerplant in Chandpur District. MG Knit Flair Limited was established in 2005 in Gazipur District. MG Sweater Sample was established in Khilkhet Kha para in 2005. Mohammadi Group established MG Shirtex Limited in 2005. It clients include Costco, H&M, Sears, and Walmart. From December 2005 to July 2006, Anisul Haq, Chairman of Mohammadi Group, was the president of the Bangladesh Garment Manufacturers and Exporters Association.

TechnoVista Limited created a joint venture called BordingVista Limited with Boarding group, a company of Denmark, in 2007 which was later renamed to Fiftytwo Digital Limited in 2019. In 2007, teams from project D-Youth visited the group in Nikunja. In 2007, Bangladesh Garment Manufacturers and Exporters Association nominated chairman of Mohammadi Group Anisul Haq to be president of Federation of Bangladesh Chambers of Commerce & Industries.

Students of Theatre Department of Jahangirnagar University performed at the factory of the group in May 2008. In 2009, workers of Mohammadi Fashion 2000 Limited burned down their factory due to not being paid. The workers had to be dispersed by Bangladesh Police and Rapid Action Battalion which left more than 500 workers injured. Mohammadi Fashion 2000 Limited was a sister concern of the Mohammadi Group.

In 2013, one of the founders of Desh Energy, Nuher Latif Khan, sued Anisul Haq and his son alleging they took control over the company from him through threats and intimidation.

Mohammadi Group established MG Niche Flair Limited in 2015. It's chairman, Anisul Haq, served as the president of Bangladesh Garment Manufacturers and Exporters Association and Federation of Bangladesh Chambers of Commerce & Industries. Rubana Haq received the Bangladesh Business Awards from DHL Express in 2015.

Mohammadi Group launched Jadoo Digital in April 2016 as a digital cable operator. MG Niche Flair Limited (Woven) was established in 2016. MG Niche Stitch Limited was established in 2016. The group signed an agreement with Asian University for Women to send employees, selected through tests, for higher education on scholarship. In December 2017, chairman, Anisul Haq died who was then Mayor of North Dhaka.

In 2018, it was exporting three million sweaters a year.

Chairman Rubana Haq was a founding member of Bangladesh-Türkiye Business Forum. In 2019, its chairman Rubana Huq became the first female president of the Bangladesh Garment Manufacturers and Exporters Association. Navidul Hoque was the managing director of the group. In 2021, Faruque Hassan, replaced her as president of the Bangladesh Garment Manufacturers and Exporters Association; Hasan was the managing director of Giant Group. She asked garment workers to not complain to foreigners. The group received 20 to 25 billion taka in subsidies from the government for electricity generation. It signed an agreement with Bangladesh Power Development Board to build a powerplant in Hatiya for 13.96 billion taka to be paid to Desh Energy over a 15-year period.

The group operates a subsidized store for its garment workers.

Businesses 
 Jadoo Media Limited (Nagorik TV)
 Digi Jadoo Broadband Limited
 Desh Energy Limited
 Desh Cambridge Kumargaon Power Company Limited
 Desh Energy Chandpur Power Company Limited
 MG Properties Limited
 TechnoVista Limited
 Fiftytwo Digital Limited
 MG Shirtex Limited
 Mohammadi Group Limited
 Mohammadi Limited (Sample)
 Mohammadi Fashion Sweaters Limited
 MG Knit Flair Limited
 MG Sweater Sample
 MG Niche Flair Limited
 MG Niche Stitch Limited
 MG Niche Flair Limited (Woven)

References 

1986 establishments in Bangladesh
Organisations based in Dhaka
Conglomerate companies of Bangladesh